"Get It On Tonite" is the lead single released from American singer turned pastor Montell Jordan's fourth album, Get It On...Tonite (1999). The song was produced by Brian "Lilz" Palmer and Sergio "PLX" Moore, who used a sample of Claudja Barry's 1976 single "Love for the Sake of Love".

"Get It On Tonite" reached number four on the US Billboard Hot 100, becoming his last solo single to chart on the Hot 100. It also spent three consecutive weeks at number one on the Hot R&B/Hip-Hop Songs chart and sold 800,000 copies domestically. A remix entitled "Get It on with LL and Montell", which features labelmate LL Cool J, was included on several formats of the single.

Samplings

In July 2012, "Get It On Tonite" was sampled on Harlem rapper Azealia Banks's first mixtape, Fantasea, on the penultimate track "Esta Noche". Pitchfork Media's Marc Hogan praised the track, saying that "the best and penultimate cut on Fantasea, "Esta Noche", points in a promising new direction: conversational, cheater-luring pickup lines over a warmly inviting sample from Montell Jordan's 1999 R&B hit "Get It on Tonite". Critics praised producer Munchi's fusion of electronic dance music and R&B, with the track being named as a highlight of the tape.

Track listings

US CD and cassette single
 "Get It On Tonite" (LP version) – 4:16
 "Get It On with LL & Montell" (with LL Cool J) – 3:47
 "Once Upon a Time" (LP version) – 4:36

US 12-inch single
A1. "Get It On Tonite" (radio edit)
A2. "Get It On Tonite" (LP version)
B1. "Get It On Tonite" (instrumental)
B2. "Get It On Tonite" (acappella)

UK CD1
 "Get It On Tonite" (radio edit)
 "This Is How We Do It" (Puff Daddy radio mix)
 "Somethin' 4 da Honeyz" (radio version)
 "Get It On Tonite" (video)

UK CD2
 "Get It On with LL & Montell" (radio edit with LL Cool J)
 "This Is How We Do It" (Funkmaster Flex radio mix)
 "I Like" (radio edit)

European CD single
 "Get It On Tonite"
 "Maybe She Will"

European maxi-CD single
 "Get It On Tonite"
 "Maybe She Will"
 "Get It On Tonite" (instrumental)
 "Get It On Tonite" (video)

Charts

Weekly charts

Year-end charts

Certifications

Release history

References

1999 singles
Def Jam Recordings singles
Montell Jordan songs
Songs written by Montell Jordan